The Gladna or Râul is a left tributary of the river Bega in Romania. It discharges into the Bega in Leucușești. The Surduc Dam is built on the Gladna.

References

Rivers of Romania
Rivers of Timiș County